Rachael (or Rachel)  was launched in 1795 at Spain and may have been taken in prize in 1799. She entered British records in 1801. In 1803 she suffered a maritime mishap, and later was captured by a French privateer, but recaptured by the British Royal Navy. She was lost at Fayal, Azores in 1810.

Career
Rachel first appeared in Lloyd's Register (LR) in 1801 with S.Elison, master, Hunter & Co., owner, and trade Liverpool–Suriname. She had undergone small repairs in 1801.

On 22 February 1803 Lloyd's List (LL) reported that Rachel, Ellison, master, had come from Cadiz and had run aground on the Parade Bank in Liverpool Bay on 16 February 1803. She was gotten off and then was at Liverpool, full of water.

Captain Seacombe Ellison acquired a letter of marque on 25 June 1803.

Vaillant captured Rachael and sent her for Bordeaux.

On 6 December 1803  recaptured Rachael. Rachael came into Plymouth.

Captain Joseph Williams acquired a letter of marque on 16 September 1807. On 17 October 1808 Rachael, Williams, master, was on her way back to Liverpool from Africa when she had to put in to Bristol in some distress.

Fate
Lloyd's List reported on 20 March 1810 that Rachel, Wylie, master, had been wrecked at Fayal with the loss by drowning of Wylie and five of his crew. The Register of Shipping (RS) for 1810 had the annotation "LOST" by her name.

Citations

1795 ships
Age of Sail merchant ships of England
Ships built in Spain
Captured ships
Maritime incidents in 1803
Maritime incidents in 1808
Maritime incidents in 1810
Shipwrecks of the Azores